Matthew Jon-Porter Elich (born September 22, 1978) is an American former professional ice hockey winger.

Biography
Elich was born in Grosse Pointe, Michigan. As a youth, he played in the 1992 Quebec International Pee-Wee Hockey Tournament with the Detroit Little Caesars minor ice hockey team.

Elich played junior ice hockey with the Windsor Spitfires in the Ontario Hockey League. He was drafted in the third round, 61st overall, by the Tampa Bay Lightning in the 1997 NHL Entry Draft.

Elich made his National Hockey League debut with the Lightning during the 1999–2000 NHL season, appearing in eight games and scoring one goal. He appeared in eight more games for the Lightning during the 2000–01 NHL season.

Career statistics

References

External links

1978 births
American men's ice hockey right wingers
Cardiff Devils players
Detroit Vipers players
Flint Generals players
Greensboro Generals players
HK Acroni Jesenice players
Ice hockey players from Michigan
Idaho Steelheads (ECHL) players
Kalamazoo Wings (2007–2009) players
Kingston Frontenacs players
Living people
Pensacola Ice Pilots players
People from Grosse Pointe, Michigan
Port Huron Icehawks players
Roanoke Valley Vipers players
South Carolina Stingrays players
Springfield Falcons players
Tampa Bay Lightning draft picks
Tampa Bay Lightning players
Wheeling Nailers players
Windsor Spitfires players
American expatriate ice hockey players in Switzerland
American expatriate ice hockey players in Wales
American expatriate ice hockey players in Germany
American expatriate ice hockey players in Slovenia
American expatriate ice hockey players in Canada